The Nipissing sills, also called the Nipissing diabase, is a large 2217– to 2210–million year old group of sills in the Superior craton of the Canadian Shield in Ontario, Canada, which intrude the Huronian Supergroup. Nipissing sills intrude all the Huronian sediments and older basement rocks in the northern margin of the Sudbury Basin; they were emplaced after the faulting and folding of Huronian rocks, and are hornblende gabbro of tholeiitic basalt composition. In the Sudbury–Elliot Lake area the Nipissing diabase is deformed; outcrops are parallel to the fold axes of the Huronian sedimentary rocks.

The Nipissing sills in the Southern Province of the Superior craton are thought to originate from a radiating dike swarm area  to the northeast. The mantle source for the Nipissing sills did not come from the mantle beneath the Southern Province that had generated the 2500– to 2450–million year old Matachewan dike swarm.

See also
Volcanism of Eastern Canada

References

Igneous petrology of Ontario
Sills (geology)
Paleoproterozoic magmatism
Landforms of Sudbury District
Landforms of Nipissing District
Geology of Greater Sudbury
Mafic intrusions